was a town located in Saga District, Saga Prefecture, Japan. The status of Kubota was changed from a village to a town on April 1, 1967.

As of 2003, the town had an estimated population of 8,078 and a density of 561.36 persons per km². The total area was 14.39 km².

On October 1, 2007, Kubota, along with the towns of Higashiyoka and Kawasoe (all from Saga District), was merged into the expanded city of Saga.

Dissolved municipalities of Saga Prefecture